The 2011 Grambling State Tigers football team represented Grambling State University as a member of the West Division of the Southwestern Athletic Conference (SWAC) during the 2011 NCAA Division I FCS football season. The Tigers were led Doug Williams in the first season of his second stints as head coach and seventh overall after coaching the Tigers from 1998 to 2003. The Tigers finished the season 8–4 overall and 6–3 in SWAC play to win the West Division and defeated Alabama A&M in the SWAC Football Championship Game, 16–15, to become SWAC champions. The team played home games at Eddie Robinson Stadium in Grambling, Louisiana.

Schedule

References

Grambling State
Grambling State Tigers football seasons
Southwestern Athletic Conference football champion seasons
Grambling State Tigers football